The Simeto class  is a class of three auxiliary ships built for the Italian Navy for emergency water replenishment of islands. One ship of the class, the Simeto, was transferred to the Tunisian Navy in 2003.

Ships

References

External links
Ticino (A 5376) Marina Militare website
Tirso (A 5377) Marina Militare website

Auxiliary ships of the Italian Navy
Ships built in Italy